Roman Leybyuk (born 16 January 1977 in Yaremche) is a Ukrainian cross-country skier who has competed since 1998. Competing in three Winter Olympics, he earned his best finish of 11th in the 10 km + 10 km combined pursuit at Salt Lake City in 2002.

Leybyuk's best finish at the FIS Nordic World Ski Championships was 14th in the 4 x 10 km relay at Val di Fiemme in 2003 while his best individual finish was 33rd twice (10 km: 1999, 15 km: 2005).

His best World cup finish was seventh at a 15 km event in Finland in 2004.

References

1977 births
Cross-country skiers at the 2002 Winter Olympics
Cross-country skiers at the 2006 Winter Olympics
Cross-country skiers at the 2010 Winter Olympics
Living people
Olympic cross-country skiers of Ukraine
Ukrainian male cross-country skiers
Universiade medalists in cross-country skiing
Universiade gold medalists for Ukraine
Competitors at the 2005 Winter Universiade